Uuyoka Combined School is a government school in Uuyoka village in northern Namibia. It was established during the colonial era in 1961. The first lessons took place under the Camelthorn tree (local 'Okathiya') and lessons were given by local peoples. The school covers grades 1 to 10 and a kindergarten that was inaugurated in 2010 and has about 700 students.

See also

 List of schools in Namibia
 Education in Namibia

References

Schools in Oshikoto Region